Cuban motion is characterized by a rhythmic rotation of the hips around the spine, caused by the bending and straightening of the knees (though the knees remain "soft" —slightly bent— at all times). It is a style of movement which should be present in American Rhythm dances, including bachata, mambo, salsa, rhumba, merengue, samba and cha-cha-cha. It tends to be easier to dance and more noticeable when the music is slow.

References

External links
 

Dance moves
Ballroom dance technique